Alphasida is a genus of beetles belonging to the family Tenebrionidae.

The species of this genus are found in Southern Europe, Northern Africa and Northern America.

Species

Species:

Alphasida alcirensis 
Alphasida alonensis 
Alphasida altomirana

References

Tenebrionidae